Operation Conservation was an attempt by the British Army to ambush a large Provisional Irish Republican Army (IRA) unit along the Dorsey Enclosure, between Cullyhanna and Silverbridge, in south County Armagh. The action took place on 6 May 1990 but was thwarted by the South Armagh Brigade of the IRA.

British plan
The British Army, in the hope of luring a large IRA active service unit into attacking an entrenched Light Infantry unit, deployed its troops around the route between Cullyhanna and Silverbridge. A machine-gun ambush had taken place on another Light Infantry patrol on 28 April near the same area. More than 180 rounds were fired and a soldier was wounded in the leg. The main position was to be surrounded and watched by 16 concealed sections belonging to the 2nd Battalion Scots Guards. The goal was to surprise and kill any IRA unit attempting to penetrate the area.

The action
The troops were inserted into the zone in the early hours of 3 May. The South Armagh Brigade of the IRA watched these movements and was able to spot several of the hidden observation posts (OPs). Eventually, they decided to attack one of the British positions at Slatequarry, near Cullyhanna, which was the most exposed. According to the writer David McKittrick, the British soldiers were lured to an open field after seeing smoke coming from the chimney of a derelict building.

Just after midnight on the night of 5/6 May, the exposed British position began to receive machine-gun fire from an IRA unit emplaced on the slope of a nearby hill some 400 yards away. The IRA members had built firing positions with stones around an abandoned house, and concealed them with green military veils. The OP was fired on by two 7.62 mm General purpose machine guns (GPMGs) and a Heckler & Koch G3 rifle; the latter used to cover the retirement of the machine-gun crews towards Slatequarry road, where a vehicle was waiting to pick them up. A bomb was planted between the OP and the road to prevent any attempt to give chase. The shooting lasted some 90 seconds and 316 rounds were exchanged by the two sides, 188 by the IRA and 128 by the Scots Guards. The patrol commander Lance Sergeant Graham Stewart was hit and died of wounds the following day.

Aftermath

The counter-ambush defeated the British operation and the officer in charge cancelled it. He later stated that

In military terms, it was one of the IRA's finest attacks in South Armagh. They picked out the COP team in the most exposed position. With hindsight, it was the one weak link in the operation and it says something for the IRA's tactical and field skills that they identified that fact before we did.

After the incident, another British senior officer concluded that a skilful machine-gun crew was operating near Cullyhanna. On 20 September, another soldier was hit and severely wounded in that area by machine-gun fire during an attack on a 1st Cheshire Regiment patrol at Drumalt. On 26 September there was another casualty when a helicopter was hit as it landed at Newtownhamilton and a soldier was wounded in the abdomen. The IRA unit responsible for the ambushes was nicknamed the "Cullyhanna Gun Club" by the British army. The writer Toby Harnden suggests that the IRA show of force proved again that they could dispute the ground to the troops everywhere in South Armagh due to its better knowledge of the terrain and good camouflage.

Lance Sergeant Stewart was 24 at the time of his death. He was buried with full military honours in his home town of Perth, Scotland on 11 May 1990.

See also
 Chronology of Provisional Irish Republican Army actions (1990-1999)
 South Armagh Sniper (1990–1997)
 Attack on Cloghogue checkpoint
 Battle of Newry Road
 Glasdrumman ambush

Notes

References
 Harnden, Toby (2000). Bandit Country: The IRA & South Armagh, Coronet books; 
 O'Brien, Brendan (1999). The Long War: The IRA and Sinn Féin, Syracuse University Press; 

1990 in military history
1990 in Northern Ireland
Ambushes in Northern Ireland
British Army in Operation Banner
Conflicts in 1990
Deaths by firearm in Northern Ireland
Military actions and engagements during the Troubles (Northern Ireland)
Military history of County Armagh
Military operations in Northern Ireland involving the United Kingdom (1969–2007)
Provisional Irish Republican Army actions
Scots Guards
The Troubles in County Armagh